Fran Gerbič (5 October 1840, Cerknica – 29 March 1917, Ljubljana) was a Slovenian composer and operatic tenor.

Gerbič was born in Cerknica and entered a normal school in 1856, where his instructors included Kamilo Mašek. He was assigned to a teaching position in Trnovo (now part of Ilirska Bistrica), where he also served as organist and composed his first works.

During the 1940s Gerbič was one of the best-known composers of Yugoslavia abroad.

Works
Operas
 Kres (Midsummer) 1896 
 Nabor 1913
Songs
 Kam? (Where?)
 Pojdem na prejo (I'll Watch the Girls Spinning)
 V noči (In the Night)

References

1840 births
1917 deaths
19th-century classical composers
20th-century classical composers
Male classical composers
Male opera composers
People from Cerknica
Romantic composers
Slovenian classical composers
Slovenian male musicians
Slovenian opera composers
Yugoslav composers
20th-century male musicians
19th-century male musicians